is a Japanese CG anime television series created and animated by Sōta Sugahara. The series aired on Tokyo MX between October 12, 2011, and December 28, 2011, and was also simulcast by Crunchyroll. A special episode aired in December 2012, and a second season aired between January 9, 2013, and March 27, 2013. A spin-off series titled gdgd men's party aired between January 2018 and March 26, 2018.

Plot
The series focuses on three fairies, pkpk, shrshr and krkr, who live in Fairy Forests. Although weak in magic skill, they have a special room where they can practice magic and a fountain in which they can view the outside world.

Cast
 
An innocent pink haired fairy who is often intimidated by others.
 
A high spirited blonde fairy who is known for being a little lazy.
 
An emotionless purple haired fairy who emits poisonous fumes and has a grim outlook on life.

References

External links
Official website 

Anime with original screenplays
2011 anime television series debuts
2013 anime television series debuts
Comedy anime and manga
Crunchyroll anime
Fantasy anime and manga
Japanese computer-animated television series
Television about fairies and sprites
Tokyo MX original programming